KANN (1120 AM) is a radio station broadcasting a Contemporary Christian format. Licensed to Roy, Utah, United States, the station serves the Ogden/Salt Lake City area. The station is currently owned by Faith Communications Corporation.

KANN signed on in December 1961 on 1250 kHz. In 1967, it moved to 1090 kHz and to 1120 kHz in 1989.

KANN's skywave signal has been reported in Flagstaff, Arizona. The signal has also been received in Oak Park, California.

References

External links
FCC History Cards for KANN

Radio stations established in 1975
Contemporary Christian radio stations in the United States
Mass media in Salt Lake City
ANN